Ruth Gruber (September 30, 1911 – November 17, 2016) was an American journalist, photographer, writer, humanitarian, and United States government official.

Born in Brooklyn to Russian Jewish immigrants, she was encouraged to pursue her dream of becoming a writer. At age 20, she received a doctorate from the University of Cologne in Germany, which was awarded for her dissertation -- in German -- on Virginia Woolf.  In the 1930s, she established herself as a journalist writing about women under fascism and communism, traveling as far as the Soviet Arctic. She also served two years in Alaska as a field representative of the U.S. Department of the Interior. As World War II raged in Europe, she turned her attention to the crisis of Jewish refugees: acting on behalf of the Roosevelt administration, she escorted 1,000 refugees from Italy to the United States and recorded their stories. She witnessed the scene at the Port of Haifa when Holocaust survivors on the ship Exodus 1947 were refused entry to British-controlled Palestine, and she documented their deportation back to Germany.

In subsequent years, she covered the evacuation of Ethiopian Jews to Israel. She was a recipient of the Norman Mailer Prize.

Early life
Ruth Gruber was born in Brooklyn, New York, one of five children of Russian Jewish immigrant parents, Gussie (Rockower) and David Gruber. She dreamed of becoming a writer and was encouraged by her parents to obtain higher education. She matriculated at New York University at the age of 15. At eighteen she won a postgraduate fellowship at the University of Wisconsin–Madison. In 1931, she won another fellowship from the Institute of International Education to study in Cologne, Germany.  She received a Ph.D. from the University of Cologne in German Philosophy, Modern English Literature, and Art History, becoming (at that time) the youngest person in the world to receive a doctorate. The subject of her dissertation was Virginia Woolf. While in Germany, Gruber witnessed Nazi rallies and after completing her studies and returning to America, she brought the awareness of the dangers of Nazism.
Gruber's writing career began in 1932. In 1935, the New York Herald Tribune asked her to write a feature series about women under Fascism and Communism. While working for the Herald Tribune, she became the first foreign correspondent to fly through Siberia into the Soviet Arctic.

Special Assistant to the Secretary of the Interior
During World War II, Secretary of the Interior Harold L. Ickes appointed Gruber as his Special Assistant. In this role, she carried out a study on the prospects of Alaska for homesteading G.I.s after the war. In 1944, she was assigned a secret mission to Europe to bring one thousand Jewish refugees and wounded American soldiers from Italy to the US. Ickes made her "a simulated general" so in case the military aircraft she flew in was shot down and she was caught by the Nazis, she would be kept alive according to the Geneva Convention. Throughout the voyage, the Army troop transport Henry Gibbins was hunted by Nazi seaplanes and U-boats. Gruber's book Haven: The Dramatic Story of 1000 World War II Refugees and How They Came to America was based on case histories she recorded as she interviewed the refugees.

Since the U.S. Congress refused to lift the quota on Jewish immigration to the United States from Europe, President Roosevelt acted by executive authority and invited the group of one thousand to visit America. The refugees were to be guests of the president and upon arriving in New York, they were transferred to Fort Ontario Emergency Refugee Shelter, formerly a decommissioned Army training base in Oswego, New York, and locked behind a chain link fence with barbed wire. While U.S. government agencies argued about whether they should be allowed to stay or, at some point, be deported to Europe, Gruber lobbied to keep them through the end of the war. It was not until January 1946 that the decision was made to allow them to apply for American residency. This was the only attempt by the United States to shelter Jewish refugees during the war.

Post-war career

In 1946, Gruber took leave from her federal post to return to journalism. The New York Post asked her to cover the work of a newly created Anglo-American Committee of Inquiry on Palestine. The Committee was to decide the fate of 100,000 European Jewish refugees who were living in European camps as displaced persons (DP). Harry Truman pressed Great Britain to open the doors of British Mandate of Palestine. The committee members spent four months in Europe, Palestine, and the Arab countries and another month in Switzerland digesting their experiences. At the end of its deliberations, the committee's twelve members unanimously agreed that Britain should allow 100,000 Jewish immigrants to settle in Palestine. British foreign minister Ernest Bevin rejected the finding.

Eventually the issue was taken up by the recently established United Nations, which appointed a Special Committee on Palestine (UNSCOP). Gruber accompanied UNSCOP as a correspondent for the New York Herald.

Exodus 1947
Gruber witnessed the ship Exodus 1947 entering the Haifa harbor after it was intercepted by the Royal Navy while making an attempt to deliver 4,500 Jewish refugees. To meet the refugees, Gruber flew to Cyprus, where she witnessed and photographed refugees detained by the British. The British then sent the refugees to Port-de-Bouc in France and Gruber went there.

The refugees refused to disembark, however, and, after 18 days' standoff, the British decided to ship the Jews back to Germany. Out of many journalists from around the world reporting on the affair, Gruber alone was allowed by the British to accompany the DPs back to Germany. Aboard the prison ship Runnymede Park, Gruber photographed the refugees, confined in a wire cage with barbed wire on top, defiantly raising a Union Jack flag on which they had painted a swastika.

After 1950
In 1951, Gruber married Philip H. Michaels, a community leader in the South Bronx. She gave birth to two children, one of whom is former Assistant Secretary of Labor for Occupational Safety and Health David Michaels, and continued her journalistic travels. She wrote a popular column for Hadassah Magazine, "Diary of an American Housewife." Her niece is science writer Dava Sobel.

Some years after Philip Michaels' death in 1968, Gruber married longtime New York City Social Services administrator Henry J. Rosner in 1974.

In 1978, she spent a year in Israel writing Raquela: A Woman of Israel, about an Israeli nurse, Raquela Prywes, who worked in a British detention camp and in a hospital in Beersheba. This book won the National Jewish Book Award in 1979 for Best Book on Israel.

In 1985, at the age of 74, she visited isolated Jewish villages in Ethiopia and described the rescue of the Ethiopian Jews in Rescue: The Exodus of the Ethiopian Jews. Gruber received many awards for her writing and humanitarian acts, including the Na'amat Golda Meir Human Rights Award and awards from the Simon Wiesenthal Center's Museum of Tolerance.

On October 21, 2008, Gruber was honored for her work defending free expression by the National Coalition Against Censorship.  In 2016, an exhibit of her photographs titled Ruth Gruber: Photojournalist was on display at the Oregon Jewish Museum in Portland.

She died at the age of 105 on November 17, 2016.

In 2011, at the age of 100, Ruth Gruber's work as a photojournalist - spanning six decades on four continents - was the subject of a retrospective exhibition at the International Center of Photography in New York. The exhibition, Ruth Gruber: Photojournalist, curated by Maya Benton, is traveling internationally through 2020. Gruber's photographs, organized chronologically, include Soviet Arctic (1935-1936); Alaska Territory (1941–43); Henry Gibbons/Oswego, New York (1944); Exodus 1947; Runnymede Park (1947); Cyprus Internment Camp (1947); Israel/Middle East (1949–51); North Africa (1951-51); Ethiopia (1985).

Gruber's first volume of her autobiography Ahead of Time: My Early Years as a Foreign Correspondent was published in 1991.

Portrayals
The 2001 television film Haven is based on Gruber's life story. The film stars Natasha Richardson as Gruber and Anne Bancroft as her mother Gussie. Bancroft was nominated for an Emmy Award for her role. A documentary about Gruber's life, titled Ahead of Time, was released in 2010.

Publications

Books
 

 Witness: One of the Great Correspondents of the Twentieth Century Tells Her Story Schocken (2007) 
 Virginia Woolf: The Will To Create As A Woman, 2005
 Inside of Time: My Journey from Alaska to Israel, 2002, 2004
 Exodus 1947: The Ship That Launched the Nation, 1999, 2007
 Ahead of Time: My Early Years As a Foreign Correspondent, 1991, 2001
 Rescue: The Exodus of the Ethiopian Jews, 1987
 Haven: The Dramatic Story of 1000 World War II Refugees and How They Came to America, 1983, 2000
 Raquela: A Woman of Israel, 1978, 1985, 1993, 2000
 They Came to Stay (coauthor: Marjorie Margolies-Mezvinsky), 1976
 Die Bauern-Passion Von Waal (coauthors: Ursula Zeidler, Gerhard Eberts), 1976
 Felisa Rincon De Gautier: The Mayor of San Juan, 1972
 Puerto Rico: island of promise
 Israel on the seventh day, 1968
 Israel today: Land of many nations, 1958
 Israel without tears, 1950
 Destination Palestine: The story of the Haganah ship Exodus 1947, 1948
 I Went To The Soviet Union, 1944
 I Went to the Soviet Arctic, 1939, 1991

References

External links
Ahead of Time 2009 documentary film about Ruth Gruber — official site
Voices on Antisemitism Interview with Ruth Gruber from the United States Holocaust Memorial Museum
A Life's Worth of Living - Witnessing the Life of Foreign Correspondent, Ruth Gruber, in Her New Book "WITNESS" WNN - Women News Network, August 21, 2007
Ruth Gruber interview May 9, 2007 - BBC news, "The World" radio show.
Charting a New Map Seventy Years Later-Ruth Gruber in the Quest for Virginia Woolf by Lys Anzia 2006 Moondance magazine.
Ruth Gruber (Jewish Virtual Library)
Ruth Gruber (Jewish Women's Archive)
Miriam's Cup: Biography. Ruth Gruber
When Oswego Was a Haven (State University of New York at Oswego)
A Woman of Substance. Ruth Gruber flourishes, even in her 90s by Myrna Blyth. July 1, 2005
 EXODUS 1947 Documentary Film By Elizabeth Rodgers & Robby Henson  Includes Interview with Ruth Gruber

1911 births
2016 deaths
People from Brooklyn
Journalists from New York City
American centenarians
American people of Russian-Jewish descent
American women journalists
Jewish American writers
University of Wisconsin–Madison alumni
The Holocaust and the United States
American photojournalists
Women centenarians
21st-century American Jews
21st-century American women
Women photojournalists